Mark Neita (born 8 November 1960) is a Jamaican cricketer. He played in 45 first-class and 32 List A matches for the Jamaican cricket team from 1978 and 1992.

See also
 List of Jamaican representative cricketers

References

External links
 

1960 births
Living people
Jamaican cricketers
Jamaica cricketers
Sportspeople from Kingston, Jamaica